Jangziceras is a genus of fossil nautiloid cephalopods from the Middle Silurian of southern China belonging to the Orthocerida incertae sedis, its familial association undetermined. The type is Jangziceras sichuanense Lai Chai-Geen . Its description falls within the characters of the Orthocerida.

Jangziceras sichuanense was found in the Middle Silurian (Telychian) Lojoping Formation in Sichuan and Guizhou Provinces associated with orthoderids such as Sichuanaceras and Neosichuanoceras and oncocerids such as Oocerina and Guangyuanoceras among other nautiloid genera in reefal environments

References

 Ordovician and Silurian Cephalopdos from Hanzhung and Ningkiang of Shensi Lai Chai-Geen 
  Biostratigraphy of China Wen-tang Zhang, Pei-ji Chen, A. R. Palmer   
 Sepkoski, J.J. Jr. 2002. A compendium of fossil marine animal genera. D.J. Jablonski & M.L. Foote (eds.). Bulletins of American Paleontology 363: 1–560. Sepkoski's Online Genus Database (CEPHALOPODA)

Prehistoric nautiloid genera